Sheung Keng Hau is a village in the Tai Wai area of Sha Tin District, Hong Kong.

Location
Ha Keng Hau, Sheung Keng Hau and Hin Tin are three adjacent villages located along Hin Keng Street, along a northeast–southwest direction. Hin Keng Estate, located northeast of the villages and across Hin Keng Street, was named after them. Sheung Keng Hau is located southeast of Hin Keng Estate.

Administration
Sheung Keng Hau is a recognized village under the New Territories Small House Policy.

History
Sheung Keng Hau is a single-surname village, Wai, with a history of over 300 years. The Wai Ancestral Hall was rebuilt in 1930.

At the time of the 1911 census, the population of Keng Hau was 195. The number of males was 86.

See also
 Hin Keng station
 Kau Yeuk (Sha Tin)
 Keng Hau (constituency)

References

External links

 Delineation of area of existing village Sheung Keng Hau (Sha Tin) for election of resident representative (2019 to 2022)
 Antiquities Advisory Board. Pictures of Wai Ancestral Hall, No. 5 Sheung Keng Hau

Villages in Sha Tin District, Hong Kong
Tai Wai